Catocala nymphagoga, the oak yellow underwing,  is a moth of the family Erebidae. It is found in Southern Europe, from Bulgaria up to the Iberian Peninsula and sometimes further north as a migrant. It is also found in North Africa and Asia Minor.

Technical description and variation

Forewing grey more or less wholly suffused with blackish brown, the basal area, or at least its lower half, a costal patch beyond inner line, a streak from costa before outer line, and the submarginal line itself remaining pale; inner and outer lines velvety black, distinct, sometimes doubled; the inner oblique, dentate inwards on the veins; the outer biangulate externally (in vein 5, forming a deep sinus inwards, its end below the reniform pale, and an inward angle on vein 1: reniform indistinct, obscured by the brown median shade, with dark centre and outline; subterminal line waved, distinct, with darker dentate edges; hindwing yellow, with broad black terminal border, containing a small yellow spot at apex and a sinus inwardly in submedian interval: the median band narrow and straight, acutely or squarely angled on the submedian fold, the base of wing often darkened with olive fuscous; - the darkest specimens, with the forewings almost unicolorous black brown, form the ab. anthracita Thierry-Mieg : tmolia Led. has the forewing pale grey; the black median band of hindwing not angled but obscure, acutely zigzag between the veins, which are black; reniform stigma followed by a dark grey cloud, and containing a pale yellowish lunule at centre: hindwing dull red, with a narrow nearly straight black median band, shortly angled inwards on submedian fold; terminal border black, broad at apex, evenly curved on inner edge, and with a deep sinus on submedian interval. Specimens from Uralsk are all smaller, uniform brownish grey, without any black and white shading; the lines line and slight; the black streak from base above and below the submedian fold well marked; hindwing with medianband curved, thinner; terminal border nearly or quite interrupted across submedian interval. They may be distinguished for the present as subsp. detrita subsp. nov.[now full species Catocala detritaWarren, 1913'. Larva extremely like that of electa, pale yellowish grey, finely black-dotted, with two obscure dorsal streaks; hump on segment 9 small, yellowish; that on 12 slight and bifid; head small, grey with dark marks and two small reddish protuberances.

Biology
Adults are on wing from June to August depending on the location.

The larvae feed on Quercus species.

References

External links

Oak yellow underwing on UK Moths
Fauna Europaea
Lepiforum.de
Lepidoptera of Belgium
New moth species in Belgium , De Standaard Online, 27 July 2009

nymphagoga
Moths described in 1787
Moths of Europe
Moths of Africa
Moths of Asia
Taxa named by Eugenius Johann Christoph Esper